

 
Mount Clarence Station is a locality in the Australian state of South Australia located about  north-west of the state capital of Adelaide and about  west of the town of Coober Pedy.

Mount Clarence Station's boundaries were created on 26 April 2013 and given the “local established name” which is derived from the pastoral station of the same name.  The term ‘Station’ was included in the name to distinguish it from another places in Australia.  Its boundaries align approximately with those of the pastoral station.

The following roads which are maintained by the South Australian government enter the locality from the Stuart Highway to the immediate east of the locality - the Anne Beadell Highway in the south and the Mount Clarence Road in the north.  The Anne Beadell Highway continues in its state-maintained form across the railway line and terminates at the Mabel Creek homestead in the north-west after which it continues to the west while the Mount Clarence Road terminates at the Mount Clarence Station homestead.

The Adelaide–Darwin railway passes from south to north through the western side of the locality where a siding  named Manguri  is located  near  the site of the government town of Manguri.

The 2016 Australian census which was conducted in August 2016 reports that Mount Clarence Station and parts of localities located to the immediate east shared a population of 10 people.

Mount Clarence Station is located within the federal division of Grey, the state electoral district of Giles, the Pastoral Unincorporated Area of South Australia and the state government region of the Far North.

Town of Manguri
Manguri is a town proclaimed by the South Australian government on 8 December 1977. The name is an Aboriginal word previously used for the local railway station and whose meaning is unknown. Since 2013, it has been located within the locality of Mount Clarence Station.

References

Notes

Citations

Towns in South Australia
Far North (South Australia)
Places in the unincorporated areas of South Australia